The 2008 Salwator Cup was a professional tennis tournament played on hard courts. It was the first edition of the tournament which was part of the 2008 ITF Women's Circuit. It took place in Kraków, Poland between 3 and 9 November 2008.

WTA entrants

Seeds

 Petra Kvitová withdrew from the tournament and was replaced by lucky loser.

Other entrants
The following players received wildcards into the singles main draw:
  Anna Korzeniak
  Olga Brózda
  Katarzyna Piter
  Angelique Kerber

The following players received entry from the qualifying draw:
  Lina Stančiūtė
  Viktoria Kutuzova
  Veronika Kapshay
  Mervana Jugić-Salkić

The following player received entry from a Lucky loser spot:
  Margit Rüütel
  Huliya Velieva

Champions

Singles

 Anne Keothavong def.  Monica Niculescu, 7–6(4),4–6. 6–3

Doubles

 Angelique Kerber /  Urszula Radwańska def.  Olga Brózda /  Sandra Zaniewska, 6–3, 6–2

External links
Official Website
ITF Search 

Salwator Cup
WSG Open
2008 in Polish tennis